The Miss Washington's Outstanding Teen competition is the pageant that selects the representative for the U.S. state of Washington in the Miss America's Outstanding Teen pageant. The competition is held each May in Burien, Washington and consists of four categories; private interview, lifestyle and wellness, talent, evening gown and on stage question.

Madison Zantello of Bonney Lake was named Miss Washington's Outstanding Teen on August 15th, 2022. Zantello succeeds Morgan Greco of Camas, who was crowned Miss Washington's Outstanding Teen on May 29, 2022 at the Highline Performing Arts Center in Burien, Washington. She competed in the Miss America's Outstanding Teen 2023 pageant at the Hyatt Regency Dallas in Dallas, Texas on August 12, 2022 where she won the title of Miss America's Outstanding Teen 2023 along with a Preliminary Talent win and the Top Vocal Talent award. This is the second Miss America's Outstanding Teen from Washington.

Results summary
Since the program's institution in 2004, dozens of local programs have helped mentor the young women who ultimately compete on the state and national stage. Payton May and Morgan Greco, Miss America's Outstanding Teen 2020/21 and 2023 respectively, are the only national Miss America titleholders from the Miss Washington Scholarship Organization.

Local Programs
The teen program in Washington State is composed of candidates from local competitions as well as open titleholders. The local programs for Miss Washington's Outstanding Teen are as follows:
Auburn; Top 5 (2014, 2019), Semi Finalist (2013, 2015, 2016, 2017, 2018, 2022), Special Awards (2018, 2022)
Clark County/Greater Vancouver; Winner (2005, 2007), Top 5 (2011, 2017, 2021, 2022), Semi Finalist (2016, 2018, 2019, 2021), Special Awards (2021, 2022)
Grays Harbor; Top 5 (2009, 2012, 2021), Semi Finalist (2014, 2022), Special Awards (2018, 2022)
Pierce County; Winner (2008), Top 5 (2011, 2013, 2017, 2018), Semi Finalist (2009, 2012, 2016, 2021, 2022), Special Awards (2010, 2014, 2015, 2016)
Seattle/Emerald City; Winner (2018), Top 5 (2017, 2018, 2019, 2022), Top 10 (2014, 2015, 2016, 2019, 2021), Special Awards (2018, 2019)
Spokane; Winner (2017), Top 5 (2015) Semi Finalist (2012, 2018), Special Awards (2012, 2017)
Thurston County; new for 2023
Tri Cities; Winner (2011, 2012), Top 5 (2009, 2013, 2014, 2015), Semi Finalist (2010, 2018, 2022), Special Award (2011, 2012, 2014, 2015, 2017, 2022)
West Sound; Top 5 (2018, 2019), Semi Finalists (2012, 2016, 2021), Special Awards (2010, 2011, 2012, 2013, 2015)
Yakima County/Apple Valley/Sun Valley; Winner (2014), Top 5 (2008, 2016), Semi Finalists (2010, 2012, 2014, 2015, 2021), Special Awards (2009, 2010, 2012, 2015, 2016, 2018, 2019, 2021)

National Placements
 Miss America's Outstanding Teen: Payton May (2020), Morgan Greco (2023)
 2nd runners-up: Shalane Larango (2006)
 3rd runners-up: Victoria Renard (2011)
 Top 12: Janae Calaway (2013)

Awards

Preliminary awards
 Preliminary Evening Wear/On Stage Question: Tayler Plunkett (2015), Payton May (2020)
 Preliminary Talent: Nicole Renard (2012), Morgan Greco (2023)

Other awards
 Miss Congeniality/Spirit of America: Tia Moua (2018)
 America's Choice: Janae Calaway (2013)
 Advertising Award: Janae Calaway (2013)
 Non-finalist Evening Wear: Tayler Plunkett (2015)
 Non-finalist Talent: Nicole Renard (2012)
 Top Vocal Talent: Morgan Greco (2023)

Featured Competitors
Many candidates from the Miss Washington's Teen program have gone on to win titles within MAO and other distinguished pageant programs.

-Crowned Miss Washington Volunteer 2023, Sami Schubert competed in the Miss Washington's Teen program from 2013 to 2016.

-Ripley Ramous, Miss Washington Teen Volunteer 2023 competed in the Miss Washington's Teen program in 2019 and 2020-21 (Top 10). She is the daughter of the current Miss Washington's Teen Director Krystle Ramous.

-Prior to winning the Miss Washington 2022 title, Regan Gallo competed at Miss Washington's Teen 2016, placing in the Top 10.

-Reagan Rebstock was crowned the inaugural Miss Washington Volunteer 2022. She previously competed for Miss Washington's Teen in 2014 (4th Runner Up) and 2016 (1st Runner Up).

-Novalee Lewis won the Miss Washington Teen USA 2021 title. She was crowned Miss Washington's Teen 2018, and was previously Miss Junior High School America 2016.

-Nicole Renard, the 2011 Miss Washington's Teen titleholder, competed at Miss California 2016 (Top 15) before becoming Miss Washington 2017. Renard has also competed in the National American Miss program.

-Alicia Cooper, Miss Washington 2016, was first runner up to the teen title in 2011.

-Reina Almon was crowned Miss Washington 2013. She placed first runner up in 2012, in addition to holding the 2009 teen title.

-Kenzi Novell competed in the Miss Washington's Teen program in 2009 before becoming Miss Washington USA 2015.

Winners

References

External links
 Official website
 

Washington
Washington (state) culture
Women in Washington (state)
Annual events in Washington (state)